The 2007-2008 The National was held December 20-23, 2007 at Port Hawkesbury, Nova Scotia. The total purse of the event was $100,000.

Kevin Martin defeated Kevin Koe in an all-Edmonton final, claiming a total of $25,000 for his team. It would be Martin's third victory in this Grand Slam event.

Teams

Draw

Group A

Group B

Group C

Playoffs

Notes

External links

The National (December), 2007
The National (curling)
2007 in Nova Scotia
Inverness County, Nova Scotia
Curling competitions in Nova Scotia
December 2007 sports events in Canada